Chairman Mao badge is the name given to a type of pin badge displaying an image of Mao Zedong that was ubiquitous in the People's Republic of China during the active phase of the Cultural Revolution, from 1966 to 1971. The term is also used for badges associated with Mao that do not actually have a picture of him on them. It is estimated that several billion Chairman Mao badges were produced during the period of the Cultural Revolution.

History

Badges depicting Mao Zedong first appeared at the Chinese People's Anti-Japanese Military and Political College at Yan'an during the 1930s. These early badges were homemade, usually being constructed out of the metal from used toothpaste tubes.

By the 1940s badges showing Mao by himself or together with other important people were being produced in small numbers as commemorative medals or as awards for service to the Chinese Communist Party or to the army. Unlike the later Cultural Revolution period badges, which normally portrayed Mao by himself, these badges frequently portrayed Mao side by side with other Chinese revolutionary figures such as Zhu De, Chen Yi, He Long, Lin Biao and Lu Xun, or showed Mao with communist leaders from other countries, such as Stalin and Kim Il Sung. During this period badges were smaller but more robust than the Cultural Revolution period badges, and some badges produced during the 1950s were even made of gold (initially 22 carat, but later reduced to 13 or 14 carat).

After the establishment of the People's Republic of China in 1949, and throughout the 1950s and early 1960s, badges showing an image of Mao were produced mainly for special occasions, for example Chinese soldiers were given star-shaped badges with a portrait of Mao when they returned to China from the Korean War, and labourers working on the Sichuan-Tibet Highway were given gold-plated copper badges with a bilingual inscription in Chinese and Tibetan on completion of the road in December 1954.  By the mid-1960s Mao badges began to become more prevalent, and were even distributed at international events such as the 1965 Leipzig Trade Fair, but it was not until the end of 1965 that small aluminium Mao badges, similar to the Cultural Revolution badges, first started to be produced in Shanghai.

Mao badges exploded in popularity with the launch of the Cultural Revolution in 1966. Almost overnight the function of Mao badges changed completely: what had previously been largely commemorative or ceremonial items worn by a comparative few suddenly became required symbols of loyalty to Mao worn by almost everyone. Along with the "little red book" of Mao's sayings, badges with a portrait of Mao become essential indicators of the wearer's loyalty to Mao, worn on the left side just above the heart. Bigger badges indicated a greater degree of loyalty to Mao, and some even pinned the badges directly into their skin as an extreme indication of their loyalty. Conversely, members of the landowning class and other perceived reactionaries were not allowed to wear Mao badges, with the conspicuous lack of a Mao badge marking them out as enemies of the people.

At the beginning of the Cultural Revolution few ordinary people wore Mao badges in the ordinary course of their daily life, and although production of badges in Shanghai increased steadily from 32,000 in July 1966 to 175,000 the following month, it was only when Mao was presented with some Mao badges by Red Guards at a mass rally at Tiananmen Square on 18 August 1966 that the wearing of these badges became widespread. In September 1966 production of Mao badges in Shanghai soared to 1.3 million, and during the height of the Cultural Revolution, from 1968 to 1971, an estimated total of between 2 and 5 billion Chairman Mao badges were produced throughout the country. Badges were primarily distributed to workers, students and soldiers by their work units, and they were not widely available for purchase at shops. Badges were further distributed by trading between friends or on the black market, and by being given as gifts.

The high tide of Mao badge mania was reached in April 1969, during the 9th National Congress of the Chinese Communist Party, when huge numbers of Mao badges were produced for distribution at the congress. However, the vast quantities of aluminium being used was having serious repercussions on Chinese industry, causing Mao to demand "Give me back the airplanes", and in June 1969 the Central Committee of the Chinese Communist Party issued a document forbidding the production of any more Mao badges unless specially authorized. After the death of Lin Biao in September 1971, the wearing of Mao badges declined rapidly, and few people outside rural areas wore Mao badges in public during the latter part of the Cultural Revolution, from 1972 to 1976. After the fall of the Gang of Four and subsequent end of the Cultural Revolution in October 1976, a month after the death of Chairman Mao, work units started to organize the collection and recycling of Mao badges, although many people secretly held on to their badges.

Description of badges

The typical Chairman Mao badges of the Cultural Revolution period were made from an aluminium base, either coloured gold or left silver, covered with a red plastic pattern, to produce a red and gold or a red and silver design. Other colours were also used sometimes, such as yellow for a field of sunflowers as a background to Mao. In addition to the typical aluminium and plastic badges, badges were also made in other materials, such as porcelain, bamboo, perspex and plastic, but these made up only a tiny fraction of the total number of badges produced.
The vast majority of designs have the same profile image of Mao, coloured gold or silver, always looking to the left. The central image of Mao is usually set in a red background, which may be plain or patterned, with or without a border design, and with or without an inscription. Inscriptions vary from a single character (most commonly 忠 zhōng meaning "loyalty") to quotations from Mao or lines of his poetry, or simply slogans such as "the Revolutionary Committee is good".

Most badges have an inscription on the reverse, which often recorded where the badge was made and, if appropriate, what special occasion it commemorated. In addition the reverse may also feature a revolutionary slogan, a quotation from Mao, or respectful wishes for long life to Chairman Mao. Thus each obverse design may have hundreds of different varieties with different reverse inscriptions, being produced in different parts of the country or to commemorate different events.

Classification of badges
The British Museum catalogue of Chairman Mao badges classifies the obverse designs of Mao badges from the Cultural Revolution period as follows.

A. Mao profile
 small, round, gold
 small, round, red and gold
 small, rectangular, with inscription/image
 small, rectangular, Selected Works, plastic
 small, diamond/starshaped, red and gold
 small, with Lenin
 small, round, red and gold
 small, rectangular, with inscription/image
 small, round, red and gold, with sunray striations
 round, red and gold
 round, red and gold, with inscription/image
 round, red and gold, with sunray striations
 round, red and gold, with sunray striations (border only)
 round, red and gold, with sunray striations, with inscription/image
 round, red and gold, with sunray striations, with outer border
 red and gold, three sunflowers/hearts/loyalty characters
 red and gold, five sunflowers
 red and gold, seven sunflowers
 red and gold, nine sunflowers
 red and gold, outer border of sunflowers
 red and gold, with Tian'anmen
 red and gold, with Shaoshan
 red and gold, with Jinggangshan
 red and gold, with Zunyi
 red and gold, with Yan'an
 red and gold, with Great Hall of the People
 red and gold, with various revolutionary sites
 red and gold, on map of China
 red and gold, waves/warship
 red and gold, with sunray striations, waves/warship
 red and gold, waves/warship, red flag(s)
 red and gold, with sunray striations, ship approaching
 red, gold and white, lighthouse, globe
 red and gold, with sunray striations, globe
 red and gold, train, red flag(s)

B. Mao in military attire
 Mao profile, round, red and gold, with sunray striations
 Mao profile, star-shaped, red and gold, with sunray striations
 Mao profile, round, red and gold, with inscription/image
 Mao three-quarters, red and gold, with sunray striations
 Mao three-quarters, red, gold and white, warship, red flag
 Mao with cap, Yan'an portrait
 Mao three-quarters with cap, red and gold

C. Mao portraits in civilian attire
 head and neck, open collar
 head and neck
 Beidaihe portrait
 Mao with bamboo hat, wearing jacket
 Mao with bamboo hat, wearing white shirt
 Mao goes to Anyuan portrait
 Mao at the 9th National Congress of the Chinese Communist Party, counting out points on his fingers
 Mao with armband raising his right arm
 Mao in overcoat with seven buttons, raising his right arm
 Mao in overcoat with six buttons, raising his right arm
 Mao with overcoat over his right arm

D. Badges without Mao's portrait
 Small badges without portrait of Mao
 Rectangular badges, red and gold, inscription only

Collections

Even during the Cultural Revolution, Mao badges were extensively collected, traded and given as gifts. However it is unlikely that anyone was able to match the collection of Mao badges that Ye Qun, wife of Lin Biao, managed to put together at the start of the Mao badge craze. She collected several thousand different types of Mao badges to give to Mao on his 73rd birthday on 26 December 1966, although she was unable to achieve the symbolic target of ten thousand badges that she was hoping for.

After the end of the Cultural Revolution upon Mao's death in September 1976, Mao badges were meant to be handed in for recycling, but many or most remained in private ownership. From the mid-1980s Mao memorabilia became very collectible, and Mao badges could be bought at flea markets across China. There are now many private collectors of Mao badges in China, with the most prolific collectors accumulating tens of thousands of specimens. Wang Anting from Chengdu, had a collection of more than 50,000 badges by 2001, and in 2006 Lin Yizhou  was reported to have amassed a collection of more than 200,000 badges. The Jianchuan Museum in China has a vast collection of Cultural Revolution material. Outside of China, some museums have started to acquire collections of objects relating to Mao, including badges, and the British Museum in London has a modest but well-catalogued collection of nearly 350 Mao badges.

In 2011, it was reported that a man named Yu Guojie had a collection of over 1.5 million Mao badges, ranging from 1 centimeter in diameter to 1.08 meters in diameter. In 2012, a 30,000-square-meter museum opened to display his collection.

In museums
Outside of China, there are private and public collections of Mao badges: at the British Museum (London, UK), at the Kulturen Museum (Lund, Sweden), the Thomas Fisher Rare Book Library, University of Toronto,
Sumio Sakurai and others.'See also
 Kim Il-sung and Kim Jong-il badges
 Quotations from Chairman Mao Tse-tungFootnotes

References
 
 
 
 
＊｛｛Cite book　｜　last=Sakurai | first Sumio | year= 1994 I title = The era of MaoZedong looking through "Badges" ,"  SINICA" Monthly " Vol.5/No.6 I publisher = Taishukan Shoten | language Japanese.

Further reading

 Exhibition of Chairman Mao badges 
 Maozhang: Mao badge website in English
 Everyday Life in Maoist China - photographs of the time
 "Dr. Douglas Reynolds, 2016 Fall Forum - Mao Badges in the Billions" (https://www.youtube.com/watch?v=V6GPNZNHwbg Lecture on YouTube, in four parts)
 Emily Williams, "Long Live Chairman Mao (badges): buttons as revolutionary objects"; in Static Issue 9.
 "Aluminum and Mao badges wholesale: four receipts from the Cultural Revolution (1967–68)" (April 2015), http://prchistory.org/april-2015/
 "More on Mao badges: Documenting a non-event" (June 2016), http://prchistory.org/june-2016/
 Daniel Leese, Mao Cult: Rhetoric And Ritual In China's Cultural Revolution (Cambridge University Press, 2013)
 Mary Ginsberg, The Art of Influence: Asian Propaganda (British Museum Press, 2013)
 Amy Jane Barnes, Museum Representations of Maoist China: From Cultural Revolution to Commie Kitsch'' (Routledge, 2014)
 Icons of Revolution: Mao badges then and now, exhibition at the British Museum, 2008

Badges
Chinese culture
Cultural Revolution
People's Republic of China culture
Cultural depictions of Mao Zedong
1966 introductions